Sherman Yellen (born February 25, 1932, New York City) is an American playwright, screenwriter, and political commentator.

Early life and education
Sherman Yellen was born in 1932 to Nathan and Lillian Yellen. He attended the High School of Music & Art and graduated from Bard College in 1953.

At Bard, Yellen studied creative writing with Texas novelist William Humphrey, was named John Bard Scholar in his sophomore year and received the Wilton E. Lockwood Award for Literature upon graduation. In later years he received the Charles Flint Kellogg Award in Arts and Letters. He attended graduate school at Columbia University where he studied 18th century English Literature.

Career
Yellen's first play was New Gods For Lovers, which was produced at the HB Playhouse in New York. This play, entered in a playwriting competition, won the Hallmark Award, and he began to write television dramas for the Hallmark Hall of Fame. Yellen also wrote Beauty and the Beast, and An Early Frost, television films for NBC.

His American Civil War television drama, Day Before Battle, was written in collaboration with his friend, playwright Peter Stone, and appeared on Studio One. Yellen also wrote adaptations of Great Expectations, Dr.Jekyl and Mr. Hyde, Phantom of the Opera. Yellen also wrote for the PBS series The Adams Chronicles.

Yellen's work in Broadway theatre includes his Tony-nominated libretto for the musical, The Rothschilds, with music by Jerry Bock and Sheldon Harnick; Rex, a musical about the life and loves of Henry VIII with music by Richard Rodgers and Strangers, a biographical drama about Sinclair Lewis. His satirical sketch, Delicious Indignities, appeared in the erotic revue, Oh! Calcutta!, which featured sketches from Sam Shepard, John Lennon, Samuel Beckett, and others.

He later incorporated the music of popular songwriter Jimmy McHugh into a new musical about young journalists in Paris in 1927, Lucky in the Rain, which had a successful run at the Goodspeed Opera. His collaboration with composer Wally Harper on Say Yes created a light hearted-musical comedy about the 1939 New York World's Fair, produced in 2000 for the Berkshire Theatre Festival. In Josephine Tonight!, a musical biography of the early life of Josephine Baker produced by Theatre Building Chicago, Yellen was librettist and lyricist to composer Harper. "Josephine Tonight!" was recently revived as "Blackbird" and was staged in Washington, D.C. and Florida.

Yellen's most recent straight play, December Fools, a comedy-drama about a composer's widow and her daughter, was produced by Abingdon Theatre Company in 2006. The same year, Josephine Tonight was produced by Theatre Building Chicago.

Yellen has written numerous op-ed columns for HuffPost, focusing on culture and American politics from a left-wing perspective.

Personal life 
As an undergraduate at Bard College, Yellen met Joan Fuhr. The couple wed after their graduation and have two sons, Nicholas and Christopher. Yellen lives on the Upper East Side of Manhattan.

Film and television credits

 Not a Penny More, Not a Penny Less (TV movie) - Writer (teleplay) 1990
 I'll Take Manhattan (TV mini-series) - Writer (writer) 1987
 An Early Frost (TV movie) - Writer (story) 1985
 The Phantom of the Opera (1983 TV movie) - Writer (writer) 1983
 The Last Giraffe (TV movie) - Writer (writer) 1979
 Hallmark Hall of Fame (TV series) - Writer (1 episode, 1976): "Beauty and the Beast"
 The Adams Chronicles (PBS Series) - Writer 1976
 Great Expectations (TV movie) - Writer (writer) 1974
 Dr. Jekyll and Mr. Hyde (TV movie) - Writer (writer) 1973
 Oh! Calcutta! - Writer (contributions) 1972
 The Iron Horse (TV series) - Writer (1 episode, 1967): "Welcome for the General"
 12 O'Clock High (TV series) - Writer (1 episode, 1965): "Target 802" 
 Studio One in Hollywood (TV series) - Writer (1 episode, 1956): "A Day Before Battle"

Theatre credits 
 Josephine Tonight (revised five character version) Metro Stage, Written by Sherman Yellen – 2012
 December Fools (Original, play) Written by Sherman Yellen – 2006
 Josephine Tonight! (Original TBC Chicago studio production of musical) Book and Lyrics by Sherman Yellen - 2006
 This Fair World (Original, Musical) Book by Sherman Yellen
 Say Yes! aka This Fair World (Original, Musical) Book by Sherman Yellen - 2000
 Lucky in the Rain (Original, Musical) Book by Sherman Yellen - 1997 
 Strangers (Original, Play) Written by Sherman Yellen - 1979
Oh! Calcutta! (Revival, Musical, Revue) - Sketch contribution ("Delicious Indignities") by Sherman Yellen - 1976–89
 Rex (Original, Musical) - Book by Sherman Yellen - 1976; revised version Toronto Civic Light Opera Company 2010
 The Rothschilds (Original, Musical) - Book by Sherman Yellen - 1970-72

Awards
 Hallmark Award - New Gods for Lovers
 Christopher Award - Hallmark Hall of Fame ("Beauty and the Beast" episode)
 Emmy Award - The Adams Chronicles
 Emmy Award - An Early Frost

See also
 An Early Frost
 Huffington Post
 The Environmentalist
 William Humphrey

External links
 Sherman Yellen papers, 1957-2015, held by the Billy Rose Theatre Division, New York Public Library for the Performing Arts.
 
 
 Sherman Yellen on The Huffington Post
 Sherman Yellen on The Environmentalist
 Interview with Sherman Yellen on Theatre in Chicago
 Review of Yellen's 'Josephine Tonight!'

References

Writers from New York City
20th-century American dramatists and playwrights
1932 births
Bard College alumni
Living people
Environmental bloggers
Primetime Emmy Award winners